Benedictine Nuns of Perpetual Adoration of the Blessed Sacrament is an female enclosed Catholic order founded in Paris, France in 1653 by Mechtilde of the Blessed Sacrament.

Each monastery of the order is autonomous. Congregational monasteries are located in France, the Netherlands, Luxembourg, Mexico, Poland, Germany, Uganda, Italy and Haiti. According to a 2011 statistic, overall 553 nuns were members of the order at the time.

History 
The founder of the order, Mechtilde of the Blessed Sacrament, was the superior of the Annonciades under the name of Sister Catherine of the Saint-John the Evangelist. Due to wars, the nuns had to leave their monastery. The exile roam lasted about two and a half years, and caused illness, leaving Catherine with only five nuns. Finally, in May 1638, the sisters found shelter in the Benedictine order at Rambervillers. After some time the superior of the Benedictine family of Rambervillers proposed that the sisters join their assembly, which they did. Then, Catherine took the name Mechtilde. Already then, for a long time she has had a special honor for the Eucharist.

In 1653, with the help of Queen Anne of Austria, the first monastery of the new congregation was established in Paris, France. After the constitution was approved, the sisters began to make an additional vow to sustain the cult and ceaseless adoration of the Blessed Sacrament.

Poland 

In Poland, the first convent of Benedictine of the Most Blessed Sacrament was founded in Warsaw in 1688 by Queen Marie Casimire in recognition of the victory of Polish King's Jan III Sobieski victory over the Turks near Vienna (1683).

The nuns departed from France on August 22, 1687, and arrived to Warsaw after two months of travel. Since the monastery was not yet built for them, they temporarily lived in the Royal Castle, where they started their adoration on January 1, 1688. They moved to a new monastery on June 27, 1688.

The Warsaw monastery is the only foundation from the time of the founder that exists continuously in the same place, and one of ten established during the lifetime of Mother Mechtilde. During the Warsaw Uprising in 1944 the church and convent were completely destroyed, burying in its ruins 35 nuns and a high number of inhabitants of the Old Town. During the 2022 Russian invasion of Ukraine, women’s Benedictine monasteries around the world have offered financial support to assist refugees and aid those suffering in Ukraine. The funds are sent to the Abbess of the Monastery in Warsaw, who is in contact with sisters in Ukraine. 

The second convent in Poland was established in Lviv in 1715. In 1946, it was repatriated to the Silesia, and is now located in the City of Wrocław. The third convent in Poland, founded in 1959, is located in Siedlce, in the Podlasie area.

Activity 
The nuns live according to the rules of Benedict of Nursia. The order has a contemplative character, and the center of life is the cult of the Eucharist. Depending on the monastery, the sisters bake the host, produce rosaries, icons, candles and food products.

The sisters live in a strictly enclosed way, nevertheless, they may take in their circle a few people who want religious life with adoration of the Blessed Sacrament without the obligation to keep a strict enclosure.

The religious costume in Poland, Italy and some of the monasteries in France consists of a black habit belted with a leather belt, a black scapular, a white bonnet surrounding the face and a black veil. On the chest there is (except for monasteries in Germany) the symbol of the Blessed Sacrament, which may look different depending on the monastery. In other countries, the religious costume may look different.

References

Bibliography 
Annuario pontificio per l'anno 2007, Libreria editrice vaticana, Città del Vaticano, 2007. .
 Guerrino Pelliccia e Giancarlo Rocca, Dizionario degli istituti di perfezione (Volume 10), Edizioni paoline, Milano, 1974–2003.
 Marcel Albert: Frauen mit Geschichte. Die deutschsprachigen Klöster der Benediktinerinnen vom Heiligsten Sakrament. EOS Verlag, St. Ottilien 2003,  (Studien und Mitteilungen zur Geschichte des Benediktinerordens und seiner Zweige. Ergänzungsband 42)
 Ad adorationem perpetuam. Die Ewige Anbetung in den Ordensgemeinschaften des deutschen Sprachraums. Benediktinerinnen, Köln 2006 (Recherchen 23).
The Mystery of Incomprehensible Love: The Eucharistic Message of Mother Mectilde of the Blessed Sacrament. Brooklyn, NY: Angelico Press, 2020. [Contains the fullest biography of Mother Mectilde published in English so far: "Mectilde of the Blessed Sacrament and Her Times" by Canon G.A. Simon, pp. 113-51. The Afterword is a translation of Dom Jean Leclercq, OSB's "A School of Benedictine Spirituality from the 17th Century: The Benedictines of Perpetual Adoration."

External links 
 The Website of the Benedictine Nuns of Perpetual Adoration of the Blessed Sacrament
 Archives of Benedictines - Congregation of the Continuous Adoration of the Holy Sacrament in ODIS - Online Database for Intermediary Structures

 
Catholic female orders and societies
Christian religious orders established in the 17th century
Order of Saint Benedict
1653 establishments in France
Organizations established in 1653